Samuel Muthui Maina (born 1987) is a Kenyan businessman.

He was born in 1987 in Rumuruti village. He went to Mutamaiyu Primary school in 1993 and completed in 2002. He managed to score 193 marks out of 500. He was unable to proceed to high school since his parents were unable to pay the admission fees. In 2010, after stealing Sh1 123,000 from his employer, he spent six months in remand prison. He was released after the case was settled out of court and after he agreed to return the money.

After release, he took a job as a sales representative. However, the pay was not enough to return the stolen money to his previous employer. Muthui then stole Sh150,000 from this employer with the aim of starting his own business.
	
Today Muthui is the youngest Billionaire in Kenya. He is the founder and the C.E.O of Muthui Limited a company that deals with recruiting of Kenyans nation to work in foreign countries. He also runs 7 companies including the best Recording studio in Kenya Idea Records.
	
Muthui has authored a book called The Prisoner Turned Millionaire. He sat for his K.C.S.E 2014.

References

1987 births
Living people
Kenyan businesspeople
Kenyan writers
Kenyan male writers